The Social Science History Association, formed in 1976, brings together scholars from numerous disciplines interested in social history.

 Its statement of purpose is: "To bring together members of various disciplines (including economics, sociology, demography, anthropology, and history) who work with historical materials."

Social Science History, a quarterly, peer-reviewed academic journal, is the official journal of the association. Its articles bring an analytic, theoretical, and often quantitative approach to historical evidence. The journal's founders intended to "improve the quality of historical explanation" with "theories and methods from the social science disciplines" and to make generalizations across historical cases. The first issue came out in the fall of 1976. The journal's articles that are most-accessed and cited through JSTOR are about social and political movements and associated narratives.

History 
The association was formed in 1976 as an interdisciplinary group with a journal Social Science History and an annual convention. The goal was to incorporate in historical studies perspectives from all the social sciences, especially political science, sociology and economics. The pioneers shared a commitment to quantification. However, by the 1980s critics complained that quantification undervalued the role of contingency and warned against a naive positivism. Meanwhile, quantification became well-established inside economics in the field of cliometrics, as well as in political science. In history, quantification remained central to demographic studies, but slipped behind in political and social history.

See also
 Historiography, Quantification and new approaches to history

References

Social history
Social history organizations
Social historians